Christopher Weselek (born 27 July 1981 in Essen) is a rugby coach and retired German international rugby union player, having last played for the RG Heidelberg in the Rugby-Bundesliga and the German national rugby union team. He is currently one of the successful rugby coaches in Germany.

He plays rugby since 1991, when he joined the RG Heidelberg through the English Institute in Heidelberg. He played for the RG throughout his career, with the exception of spending a year in Ireland and playing for Old Wesley there. With RGH Weselek won twice the German 15er side championship, 4 times the German 7er side Championship in one time the German Pokal.

Weselek originally retired from the German national team after the Netherlands game on 26 April 2008, his 25th international, but returned to the struggling German side for the game against Portugal on 27 February 2010.

Weselek has also played for the Germany's 7's side in the past, like at the 2008 and 2009 Hannover Sevens and the 2009 London Sevens. Weselek has 30 international 15er side caps and played over 20 international 7er side tournaments.

Since 2012 he is head coach of the Rudergesellschaft Heidelberg. Under his coaching the RGH won the German 7er side championship in 2015, 2016 and 2017. Weselek also coached the German unter 19 Team during the European championship in Portugal in 2015 where Germany ended up 5th place.

Honours

Club
 German rugby union championship
 Champions: 2006, 2007
 Runners up: 2008
 German rugby union cup
 Winners: 2004

National team
 European Nations Cup - Division 2
 Champions: 2008

Stats
Christopher Weselek's personal statistics in club and international rugby:

Club

 As of 23 December 2010

National team

European Nations Cup

Friendlies & other competitions

 As of 21 March 2010

References

External links
 Christopher Weselek at scrum.com
   Christopher Weselek at totalrugby.de
  Christopher Weselek at the Hannover Sevens website

1981 births
Living people
Sportspeople from Essen
German rugby union coaches
German rugby union players
Germany international rugby union players
RG Heidelberg players
Old Wesley players
Rugby union wings
German expatriate sportspeople in Ireland
German police officers
Expatriate rugby union players in Ireland
German expatriate rugby union players